Hamsterz Life is a hamster simulation video game released by Ubisoft for the Nintendo DS. Hamsterz Life is also known as Love ♥ Hamster or Love Love Hamster in Japan.

Gameplay
Hamsterz Life is from the Petz series from Ubisoft for the handheld systems. Being released after Petz 5, it is part of the second Petz series. Hamsterz Life lets players to raise several breeds of hamsters and build fully customizable homes for them to live in. Just as in the other Petz games, players can interact with their hamsters by training, playing with, and feeding them.

At the start of the game, players can select their first hamster and name it. The hamster will then appear in a cage and be ready to play. Various actions can be chosen including training, feeding, care and other options. Training consists of teaching the hamster words (which they repeat back in their own hamster speak) by speaking the set phrases into the DS microphone. The hamster can repeat these phrases back, but inaudibly. Players can clean the cage and brush their hamsters. Hamsterz Life also includes many mini-games to play. Players can only have one hamster at home at once, any other hamsters that are owned are left with a girl with hamster ears until the player wishes to switch. The player's hamsters can visit with the hamsters of friends who also own Hamsterz Life. When playing mini-games, if players win, they receive prizes such as food or toys. Players can also let their hamster out of its cage to play in the surrounding room. There are present boxes in the room, which contain prizes they receive when their hamster finds them.

Cages

Hamsterz Life contains a variety of different cages used for housing a pet hamster. They include Standard, Steel, Toy Box, Pastel, Plant and Wood. Each cage has its own theme song. Toys can be put into the cage for the hamsters to play with. The roller coaster, the slide and the tube cannot be placed into the Standard and Steel cages, for they are too small to fit large items. 
The standard cage is the cage players will start out with when they start the game. As players play mini-games, they may win cages.

Different Types of Hamsters

Different types of hamsters are shown in the game as players choose their pet hamster. There is Djungarian, Golden, Campbell, Cutie, Baby and Panda hamsters. Each will start out as a pup and eventually grow into an adult. Players can play mini-games in order to win toys for their hamsters and teach them how to say basic phrases such as "hello" and "good-bye".

Each of the types of hamster has its own manner of speaking; Cutie speaks like a yandere, and Baby speaks both Mandarin and a Pidgin English based thereon.

Hammy

Hammy is a hamster girl seen in the game. She appears as a girl with brown hair and hamster ears. She is also seen wearing an apron with a yellow dress underneath. She explains how to do things throughout the game such as how to play mini-games, taking care of the player's hamster. She is also there to help pick out a hamster. When switching for a visiting hamster, Hammy takes them and takes care of them until players come back to swap their current hamster for another that players already have.

2006 video games
Nintendo DS games
Nintendo DS-only games
Ubisoft games
Video games developed in Japan
Virtual pet video games